34 Number Ones is the seventh greatest hits compilation album by American country artist Alan Jackson. It was released in the United States on November 23, 2010 through Arista Nashville. The release celebrates Jackson's 20-year anniversary since the release of his debut album. As of the chart dated February 26, 2011, the album has sold 200,131 copies in the US.

Content
The release includes all of Jackson's number one hits on various trade charts, from his first, "Here in the Real World", to his (at the time) latest, "Country Boy". Newly included in the release is his cover of Johnny Cash's "Ring of Fire" and Jackson's late-2010 contribution with Zac Brown Band, "As She's Walking Away". "Look at Me", a song which was initially recorded for the soundtrack to Billy: The Early Years, was previously unreleased on a Jackson album.

The Essential Alan Jackson
34 Number Ones was re-released and re-packaged on April 17, 2012 as The Essential Alan Jackson. Both albums have an identical track listing.

The Essential peaked at number 20 on the U.S. Billboard Top Country Albums chart.  It also reached #145 on the main Billboard album chart.

Track listing

Personnel on new tracks
Adapted from liner notes.

 Eddie Bayers – drums on "Ring of Fire" & "Look at Me"
 Coy Bowles – Hammond B-3 organ on "As She's Walking Away"
 Zac Brown – acoustic guitar and lead vocals on "As She's Walking Away"
 Clay Cook – electric guitar and background vocals on "As She's Walking Away"
 Jimmy De Martini – fiddle and background vocals on "As She's Walking Away"
 Larry Franklin – fiddle on "Ring of Fire"
 Paul Franklin – steel guitar on "Ring of Fire"
 Chris Fryar – drums on "As She's Walking Away"
 John Driskell Hopkins – bass guitar and background vocals on "As She's Walking Away"
 Alan Jackson – lead vocals
 Brent Mason – acoustic guitar on "Look at Me", electric guitar on "Ring of Fire"
 Gary Prim – piano on "Ring of Fire" & "Look at Me"
 John Wesley Ryles – background vocals on "Ring of Fire"
 Jimmie Lee Sloas – bass guitar on "Look at Me"
 Rafe Van Hoy – acoustic guitar on "Look at Me" 
 John Willis – acoustic guitar on "Ring of Fire"
 Lee Ann Womack – background vocals on "Ring of Fire"
 Glenn Worf – bass guitar on "Ring of Fire"

Charts

Weekly charts

Year-end charts

Certifications

References

2010 compilation albums
Alan Jackson compilation albums
Arista Records compilation albums
Albums produced by Keith Stegall
Compilation albums of number-one songs